Bhook is a 5-episodic Pakistani miniserial, produced by Momina Duraid under their banner MD Productions. The series airs on Hum TV every Friday replacing Baandi. It explores the story of Noreen played by Maria Wasti who for uncertain reasons killed her own children's by offering them poisonous food.

Cast
Maria Wasti as Naureen
Kamran Jilani as Aftab (Dead)
 Nazar Ul Hassan as Aziz
 Kosar Siddiqui as Noori
 Saad Azhar as Naseer
 Iftikhar
 Rabiya Shakeel as Rabia
 Muzaffar
 Saad Zameer Faridi
 Malik Sher Afzal as Afzal
Hina Khawaja Bayat as Gaiti's mother
Maryam Nafees as Gaiti Araa
 Saad (Child artist) as Saad
 Hamna Amir(Child artist) as Javeria

References

External links
Official website

Pakistani drama television series
2019 Pakistani television series debuts
2019 Pakistani television series endings
Urdu-language television shows
Hum TV original programming
Hum TV